HLA-B52 (B52) is an HLA-B serotype. The serotype identifies the more common HLA-B*52 gene products.

B52 is a split antigen of the broad antigen B5, and is a sister type of B51. B*5201 likely formed as a result of a gene conversion event between another HLA-B allele and HLA-B*5101.
There are a number of alleles within the B*52 allele group.

Serotype

Alleles
There are 18 alleles, with 14 amino acid sequence variants in B52. Of  these only 9 are frequent enough to have been reliably serotyped. B*5201 is the most common, but others have a large regional abundance.

Disease

In ulcerative colitis
HLA-B52 appears to have the strongest linkage to ulcerative colitis in Japan. This form of disease is frequently found with Takayasu's arteritis.

In Takayasu's arteritis
Takayasu's arteritis appears to have an independent link to B52 associated disease.  The association with B*5201 increases risk of pulmonary infarction, ischemic heart disease, aortic regurgitation, systemic hypertension, renal artery stenosis, cerebrovascular disease, and visual disturbance.

References

5